Giuseppe Angelini (1735–1811) was an 18th-century Italian sculptor active in Rome. His notable works include the tomb of Giambattista Piranesi in the church of Sta. Maria del Priorato, as well as a wax model from a funeral urn in the Capitoline Museums produced for Josiah Wedgwood.

References

External links

1735 births
1811 deaths
18th-century Italian sculptors
Italian male sculptors
19th-century Italian sculptors
19th-century Italian male artists
18th-century Italian male artists